USS Serpens may refer to the following ships of the United States Navy:

 , a United States Coast Guard-manned  in World War II.
 , an  that was on loan to South Korea for the duration of its Navy career (1951–1960).

United States Navy ship names